Etcetera (stylized as etcetera since 2014) is a Philippine lifestyle and magazine show produced by Solar Entertainment Corporation and broadcast by ETC from October 23, 2011, to December 3, 2015.

Background

Grandidge and Jones era (2011–2013)
The show was launched on October 23, 2011, on ETC, then airing via RPN Channel 9, as a result of Solar Entertainment Corporation's launching ETC Productions. Originally airing as a 15-minute capsule-based program, it expanded to a full  30-minute program during its third season in 2013. It was hosted by model and lifestyle blogger Patti Grandidge with Kim Jones as roving reporter. On November 30, 2013, ETC switched its affiliation to SBN Channel 21 and the program was continued to air with the channel.

Jones, Jasmine and LeTroyes (2013–2015)
Grandidge gave up her hosting duties shortly after the fourth season ended and on July 27, 2014, the 5th season of the show premiered with Jones remaining as host joined by newcomer Mari Jasmine. After a successful five-season run on Etcetera, Jones left to pursue other opportunities. For the sixth-season premiere which aired in 2015, Fil-Canadian-Spanish model and opera singer Melania le Troyes was introduced as the new host alongside Jasmine.

Hosts

Final hosts
 Mari Jasmine (Season 5–6) (2014–2015)
 Melania le Troyes (Season 6) (2015)

Former hosts
 Kim Jones (Season 1–5) (2011–2014)
 Patti Grandidge (Season 1–4) (2011–2013)

Program Format
Etcetera covers many topics relevant to their main audience which is the "stylish Filipina youth" and presents the different segments as capsules about fashion, beauty, TV, music and lifestyle. The series has been praised for its consistency in presenting its brand as well as being loyal to the imaging of ETC channel, in general. Various celebrities have appeared in the show such as supermodel Tweetie de Leon and America's Next Top Model winner Sophie Sumner.

Gallery

See also
 List of programs previously broadcast by SolarFlix

References

External links
 

2011 Philippine television series debuts
2015 Philippine television series endings
ETC (Philippine TV network) original programming
Radio Philippines Network original programming
English-language television shows